Romblomanon may refer to:
the Romblomanon people
the Romblomanon language